Jacques Marsigny is a retired French slalom canoeist who competed in the early-to-mid 1950s. He won three medals at the ICF Canoe Slalom World Championships with a silver (C-1 team: 1951) and two bronzes (C-1: 1951, C-1 team: 1953).

References

French male canoeists
Living people
Year of birth missing (living people)
Medalists at the ICF Canoe Slalom World Championships